is a Japanese actress.  Her feature films include Akame 48 Waterfalls (2003) and Vibrator (2003). For her role in Caterpillar (2010), Terajima won the Silver Bear for Best Actress at the 60th Berlin Film Festival while her performance in Oh Lucy! (2017) earned her an Independent Spirit Award nomination for Best Actress.

Early life
Her father is the kabuki actor Onoe Kikugorō VII, her mother the actress Sumiko Fuji, and her brother the kabuki actor Onoe Kikunosuke V.

Career
Terajima appeared in Shinobu Yaguchi's Happy Flight.

Personal life
In 2007, she married Laurent Ghnassia, a French art director based in Japan. The couple have one son, born in 2012. In an interview with The Japan Times, Terajima stated that she is raising her son to be a kabuki actor.

Filmography

Films
 Akame 48 Waterfalls (2003)
 Get Up! (2003)
 Vibrator (2003)
 Quill (2004)
 Riding Alone for Thousands of Miles (2005)
 Tokyo Tower (2005)
 Yamato (2005)
 It's Only Talk (2006)
 Ai no Rukeichi (2006)
 Happy Flight (2008) as Reiko Yamazaki
 Rush Life (2009)
 Caterpillar (2010)
 The Fallen Angel (2010)
 11:25 The Day He Chose His Own Fate (2012)
 Helter Skelter (2012)
 Sue, Mai & Sawa: Righting the Girl Ship (2012)
 The Millennial Rapture (2012)
 Japan's Tragedy (2013)
 R100 (2013)
 The Shell Collector (2016)
 Star Sand (2016)
 Haha (2017), Seki Kobayashi
 Oh Lucy! (2017)
 Flea-picking Samurai (2018), Omine
 Sakura (2020), Tsubomi Hasegawa
 A Family (2021)
 It's a Flickering Life (2021)
 Arc (2021)
 Intolerance (2021)
 2 Women (2022), Miharu Osanai
 The Three Sisters of Tenmasou Inn (2022), Keiko Tenma

Television
 Ryōmaden (2010), Sakamoto Otome
 Here Comes Asa! (2015), Rie Imai
 The Supporting Actors 2 (2018)
 Idaten (2019), Tokuyo Nikaidō
 Poison Daughter, Holy Mother (2019)
 Earwig and the Witch (2020), Bella Yaga (voice)
 The Supporting Actors 3 (2021), Herself
 Modern Love Tokyo (2022)
 What Will You Do, Ieyasu? (2023), narrator

Honours
Kinuyo Tanaka Award (2023)

References

External links

 
 shinobu terajima official website

1972 births
Japanese film actresses
Living people
Actresses from Kyoto
Silver Bear for Best Actress winners
21st-century Japanese actresses